Beyond His Fondest Hopes is a 1915 American short comedy film featuring Harold Lloyd.

Cast
 Harold Lloyd as Harold

See also
 List of American films of 1915
 Harold Lloyd filmography

External links
 

1915 films
American silent short films
1915 comedy films
1915 short films
American black-and-white films
Films directed by Hal Roach
Silent American comedy films
American comedy short films
1910s American films